St. Mary's Church was a parish church (fara) in the city of Grodno. It was founded by Vytautas, Grand Duke of Lithuania before 1389. Because of its founder, it was commonly referred to as Vytautas' Church. Rebuilt as a Gothic church around 1494, it was one of Grodno's principal Catholic churches until Soviet rule after World War II. Neglected, it was finally demolished in 1961.

History
The exact date of its consecration remains unknown, it was first mentioned in a royal privilege for the local Jewish community issued in 1389. The original church was a wooden structure, one of several dozens of such churches founded throughout Lithuania by newly-Christianised rulers of the state. As such, the church was to spread Catholic faith in a predominantly-Orthodox city. In 1494 Grand Duke (and later King of Poland) Alexander Jagiellon demolished the old wooden structure and erected a new church on its place. Its Gothic features continued to be visible despite numerous reconstructions carried out later. The first of such reconstructions took place in 1551, when Bona Sforza, queen consort of Poland, financed the Renaissance reconstruction of the interior.

The church became a de facto royal chapel in 1584, when king Stephen Báthory moved his seat to the Grodno castle and spent his last years there. It was him to completely demolish the wooden structure and build a new church there, this time brick-made. The works, carried over by the Jesuits, were completed in 1587. The project is attributed to Ioseph Roiten, though the attribution is not certain, while the master supervising the construction works was Antoni de Greta. It was in this church that Báthory's body was first interred for several months before it was moved to the Wawel Cathedral in Kraków.

During The Deluge, between 1655 and 1661, the city was occupied by Muscovy and the church was badly damaged. Burnt from the inside, it was partially demolished. Local bishop of Grodno Aleksander Chodkiewicz financed the reconstruction and by 1674 the church regained its former look. However, in the 18th century the church was again destroyed during the Great Northern War. The king of Poland financed the reconstruction, but it is not clear whether the works were finished when in 1753 a fire struck the city and the church was yet again badly damaged. It took 5 years to rebuild it. Local priest Józef Chrebtowicz hired a renowned German architect Johann Mezer to supervise the works. The church was once again consecrated on April 18, 1758.Another fire struck the city in 1782 – and again the church was badly damaged. King Stanisław August Poniatowski dispatched his court architect Giuseppe de Sacco to prepare a project of reconstruction. However, lack of funds and constant wars meant that the works went slow and in 1793 the church was described as a ruin. Following the Partitions of Poland Grodno became part of the Russian Empire. In 1804 the tsar confiscated the church and gave it to Eastern Orthodox Church. The interior was redesigned to suit the needs of a new rite and in 1810 the church was renamed to Saint Sophia's church. The façade and the tower were rebuilt in neo-classicist style in 1870. In 1892 however it was burnt down again and was rebuilt. In the late 19th century the church was completely refurbished and rebuilt in a new, pseudo-Russian style, with the project prepared by a renowned Russian architect Nikolai Mikhailovich Chagin around 1870.After Poland regained independence in 1918, the church was returned to the Catholic Church and once again became the city's principal Catholic church. Between 1919 and 1923 the church was repaired from the damages it suffered during World War I and the Polish-Soviet War. Soon afterwards a new reconstruction was started, this time in accordance with a Gothic revival project prepared by Oskar Sosnowski. The works continued until 1935. The shrine became a garrison church, serving both the inhabitants of the city and the local units of the Polish Army.

Following the Invasion of Poland of 1939, the city was occupied by the Soviet Union and the church was nationalised and closed for the public. During the German occupation of the city it was briefly restored to Catholics. At the time, the church was allocated to Grodno's Lithuanians and Lithuanian religious services were held in it throughout the war. After World War II the town was permanently annexed by the Soviet Union and the communist authorities turned the church into a warehouse. Finally on November 29, 1961 it was blown up.

References

External links
 

Churches in Grodno
Buildings and structures demolished in 1961
14th-century churches in Ukraine
Roman Catholic churches in Belarus
Gothic architecture in Belarus
Demolished churches in the Soviet Union